St. Mary's School, Sangamner is a private Catholic secondary school located on Jorve Road, in the town of Sangamner, Ahmednagar, in the state of Maharashtra, India. The school was founded the Jesuits in 1892, and is located adjacent to St. Mary's Parish Church and its mission stations. The school is affiliated to the Maharashtra State Board for Secondary and Higher Education.

History
The Jesuits arrived in Sangamner in 1892 and at once opened a school. In 1895 a  plot east of town was purchased and in the years that followed, many buildings were constructed.

In 2015 St. Mary's had a 100% success rate for its 62 students who took the Senior Secondary School Certificate exam.

See also

 List of Jesuit schools
 List of schools in Maharashtra
 Violence against Christians in India

References  

Jesuit secondary schools in India
Christian schools in Maharashtra
High schools and secondary schools in Maharashtra
Education in Ahmednagar district
Educational institutions established in 1892
1892 establishments in India